This is a list of French football transfers for the 2010 winter transfer window. The winter transfer window opened on 1 January 2010, although a few transfers took place prior to that date, and closed midnight on 31 January 2010. Only moves involving Ligue 1 and Ligue 2 clubs are listed. Players without a club may join one at any time, either during or in between transfer windows.

Transfers

 Player who signed with club before 1 January officially joined his new club on 1 January 2010, while player who joined after 1 January joined his new club following his signature of the contract.

Notes and references

Transfers
French
2009–10